Paul John Rowen (born 11 May 1955) is a British Liberal Democrat politician. He was the Member of Parliament (MP) for Rochdale from 2005 until the 2010 general election, when he was defeated by Labour Party candidate Simon Danczuk.

Early life and career
Born in Rochdale, Rowen went to the Bishop Henshaw RC Memorial High School (became St Cuthbert's RC High School in 1989 when Rochdale scrapped its three-tier system) on Shaw Road in Rochdale. From the University of Nottingham, he graduated with a BSc in Chemistry and Geology in 1976. From 1977 to 1980, he taught Science at Kimberley School in Nottinghamshire. From 1980 to 1986, he was Head of Chemistry at St Albans RC High School, Warren Lane in Oldham (now closed), then Head of Science at Our Ladys RC High School from 1986 to 1990. From 1990 to 2005, he was Deputy Headteacher of Yorkshire Martyrs Catholic College on Westgate Hill Street in Tong, West Yorkshire.

Parliamentary career
Rowen contested the Rochdale seat in the 2001 general election, and won the seat in 2005 by around 400 votes; this reclaimed the seat for the Liberal Democrats since they lost the seat in 1997.

In the House of Commons he became a Liberal Democrat spokesman for Work and Pensions, having previously worked on disability issues.

He is a member of the Beveridge Group.

Outside Parliament
Rowen is the Patron of the Greater Manchester branch of domestic violence charity the ManKind Initiative.

He is also a paid director of a Ugandan property company called Corinya.

Personal life
Rowen lists on his website that he enjoys hill-walking, travel and reading.

He is a practising Roman Catholic.

Notes and references

External links

 Paul Rowen MP  Paul Rowen's website
 Paul Rowen MP profile at the site of Liberal Democrats
 Rochdale Liberal Democrats
 Guardian Unlimited Politics - Ask Aristotle: Paul Rowen MP
 TheyWorkForYou.com - Paul Rowen MP
 The Public Whip - Paul Rowen MP voting record
 BBC Politics

News items
 Meet the MP - BBC

1955 births
People from Rochdale
Living people
Alumni of the University of Nottingham
Liberal Democrats (UK) MPs for English constituencies
UK MPs 2005–2010
Members of the Parliament of the United Kingdom for Rochdale